Isaac Hovar born 8 September 2002, is an Australian professional footballer who plays as a left back for Macarthur FC.

References

External links

2002 births
Living people
Australian soccer players
Association football defenders
Marconi Stallions FC players
Western Sydney Wanderers FC players
Macarthur FC players
National Premier Leagues players
A-League Men players